Michael Richard Kidd AM (born 11 November 1959) is an Australian medical practitioner, academic and author. He is a past president of the Royal Australian College of General Practitioners (RACGP) and a past president of the World Organization of Family Doctors (WONCA).

Background 
Michael Kidd was educated at Belle Vue Primary School, and later Trinity Grammar School, Melbourne.  In 1983, he obtained MBBS (Hons) at the University of Melbourne, a postgraduate diploma in Community Child Health at Flinders University in 1989, a research Doctorate of Medicine in medical education at Monash University in 1995, and he was awarded Fellowship of the Royal Australian College of General Practitioners in 1989.

Professional career
Kidd was President of the Royal Australian College of General Practitioners from 2002-06. He was Head of the Department of General Practice at The University of Sydney between 1998 and 2008. In 2009, he was appointed as an Honorary Professor with the School of Medicine at The University of Sydney.

From 2009-16, he served as the Executive Dean of the Faculty of Medicine, Nursing and Health Sciences at Flinders University with responsibility for the School of Medicine, the School of Nursing and Midwifery, and the School of Health Sciences. 

In 2017, he was appointed as Professor of Global Primary Care with the Southgate Institute for Health, Equity and Society at Flinders University, and as Professor and Chair of the Department of Family and Community Medicine at the University of Toronto. In 2018, he was appointed as Director of the World Health Organization Collaborating Centre on Family Medicine and Primary Care. In 2020, he was appointed as Principal Medical Advisor and Deputy Chief Medical Officer with the Department of Health,  Australia. 

He is a Member of the Australian Institute of Company Directors and has been a member of the board of directors of beyondblue since 2011.  

He served ten years as a member of the International Scientific Advisory Board of the UK Biobank Research Project based at Oxford University.

From 2008-10, he was the Chair of the advocacy organisation Doctors for the Environment Australia. He served as World President of WONCA from June 2013 to November 2016.

He is the founder and editor-in-chief of the Journal of Medical Case Reports, the world's first online, PubMed listed, international medical journal devoted solely to case reports from all medical disciplines.

He is the author/editor of several books including Save your life and the lives of those you love – your GP’s six step guide to good health, published by Allen and Unwin in 2007. According to WorldCat, the book is held in 131 libraries. His book on the health and well being of doctors and medical students entitled First Do No Harm – how to be a resilient doctor in the 21st century was published by McGraw Hill in 2009. According to WorldCat, the book is held in 123 libraries.

Government appointments 

Kidd was Chair of the Australian Government's Ministerial Advisory Committee on Blood Borne Viruses and Sexually Transmissible Infections, from 2009-16, and was also chair of the South Australian Health and Medical Research Advisory Council. 

He was also a member of the Australian Therapeutic Goods Advisory Council, the Australian Government's Medical Training Review Panel, the Privacy Advisory Committee of Australia's Federal Privacy Commissioner, and a member of the Council of the Australian Government's National Health and Medical Research Council.

Honours
Kidd is an elected Fellow of the Australian Academy of Health and Medical Sciences and the Australasian College of Health Informatics. 
He has been awarded honorary fellowships of: the Royal College of General Practitioners (UK), the Royal New Zealand College of General Practitioners, the Hong Kong College of Family Physicians, the Academy of Family Physicians of Malaysia, the College of General Practitioners of Sri Lanka, the Bangladesh Academy of Family Physicians, and the Australasian College of Nutritional and Environmental Medicine. 

He has been awarded honorary membership of the World Psychiatric Association, the Romanian National Society of Family Medicine, the Slovak Society of General Practice Medicine, and the Armenian Psychiatric Association, and honorary life membership of the Health Informatics Society of Australia and the General Practitioners' Association of Nepal. 

In 2007, he received the Australian Medical Association Award for Excellence in Health Care in recognition of his contribution to primary care, medical education and the health care of disadvantaged people in Australia. 

In 2014, he was awarded the Rose Hunt Medal, the highest award of the Royal Australian College of General Practitioners for services to Australian general practice. 

In the 2009 Queen's Birthday Honours List, he was made a Member of the Order of Australia (AM) for service to medicine and education in of general practice and primary health care, and via a range of professional organisations.

Selected works 

 Hovenga E, Kidd MR, Cesnik B (1996). Health Informatics: an Overview, Churchill-Livingstone, London. .
 Kidd MR, McCoy R (2003). Oxford Textbook of Primary Medical Care (chapter on HIV/AIDS in Primary Care), Oxford University Press, Oxford. 
 Rowe L, Kidd MR (2007). Save your life – and the lives of those you love, Allen and Unwin, Sydney. 
 Rowe L, Kidd MR (2009). First do no harm – how to be a resilient doctor in the 21st century, McGraw-Hill, Sydney. 
 Kidd MR (2013). The Contribution of Family Medicine to Improving Health Systems: a guidebook from the World Organization of Family Doctors (2nd Edition), CRC Press-Taylor and Francis, Abingdon. 
 Kidd MR, Heath I, Howe A (2016). Family Medicine: The Classic Papers, CRC Press-Taylor and Francis, Abingdon. 
 Salah H, Kidd MR (2018). Family Practice in the Eastern Mediterranean Region, CRC Press-Taylor and Francis, Abingdon. 
 Rowe L, Kidd MR (2018). Every doctor, CRC Press-Taylor and Francis, Abingdon.

References

External links 
 beyondblue

University of Melbourne alumni
Australian general practitioners
Medical doctors from Melbourne
Members of the Order of Australia
Living people
1959 births
Fellows of the Australian Academy of Health and Medical Sciences
People educated at Trinity Grammar School, Kew